The Boat in the Evening is a 1968 novel by the Norwegian writer Tarjei Vesaas. It has a fragmentary and meditative narrative which centres on a child who observes a crane colony perform its breeding ritual. It was the author's final book. It was published in English in 1971, translated by Elizabeth Rokkan.

Reception
Kirkus Reviews critic wrote: "From the work of the late Norwegian writer (this is his last book), there always seems to emanate that curious fiery chill of snow defining the edge of dark fjords, and this 'novel,' really a series of overlapping sketches and meditations, again is concerned with essential paradoxes. ... Vesaas' prose has a dynamic variety of rhythms and visual progressions so that even when the atmosphere is pure philosophic ozone, the reader can still keep his footing. But this is decidedly special."

References

External links
 Publicity page at Gyldendal Norsk Forlag's website 
 Publicity page at Peter Owen Publishers' website

1968 Norwegian novels
20th-century Norwegian novels
Norwegian-language novels
Novels by Tarjei Vesaas